Benedict Richard Pierce Macintyre (born 25 December 1963) is a British author, reviewer and columnist for The Times newspaper. His columns range from current affairs to historical controversies.

Early life
Macintyre is the elder son of Angus Donald Macintyre (d. 1994), Fellow and Tutor in Modern History at Magdalen College, Oxford (elected Principal of Hertford College, Oxford before his death in a car accident), author of the first scholarly work on the Irish nationalist Daniel O'Connell, general editor of the Oxford Historical Monographs series from 1971 to 1979, editor of The English Historical Review from 1978 to 1986, and Chairman of the Governors of Magdalen College School from 1987 to 1990, and Joanna, daughter of Sir Richard Musgrave Harvey, 2nd Baronet and a descendant of Berkeley Paget. His paternal grandmother was a descendant of James Netterville, 7th Viscount Netterville.

Macintyre was educated at Abingdon School and St John's College, Cambridge, graduating with a degree in history in 1985.

Writing 
Macintyre is the author of a book on the gentleman criminal Adam Worth, The Napoleon of Crime: The Life and Times of Adam Worth, Master Thief.

He also wrote The Man Who Would Be King: The First American in Afghanistan (about Josiah Harlan). This was also published as Josiah the Great: The True Story of the Man who Would be King. Harlan is one of the candidates presumed to be the basis for Rudyard Kipling's short story The Man Who Would Be King.

His book on Eddie Chapman, a double agent of Germany and Britain during the Second World War, was titled Agent Zigzag: The True Wartime Story of Eddie Chapman: Lover, Betrayer, Hero, Spy.

In 2008, Macintyre wrote an illustrated account of Ian Fleming, creator of the fictional spy James Bond, to accompany the For Your Eyes Only, Ian Fleming and James Bond exhibition at London's Imperial War Museum, which was part of the Fleming Centenary celebrations.

Macintyre's 2020 book  Agent Sonya: Moscow's Most Daring Wartime Spy, a biography of Soviet agent Ursula Kuczynski, was featured on BBC Radio 4 as a Book of the Week.

In 2021, Operation Mincemeat, a cinematic adaptation of Macintyre's 2010's homonymous book, subtitled The True Spy Story that Changed the Course of World War II, premiered in Australia's British Film Festival, and was released to the public in 2022.

In 2022 his book Colditz: Prisoners of the Castle was released, a history of the German prison and its inhabitants, mostly British POWs. The book received generally favorable reviews.

Personal life
He has three children and is divorced from the writer and documentary maker Kate Muir.

Documentaries
Five of his books have been made into documentaries for the BBC: 
 Operation Mincemeat (2010),
 Double Agent: The Eddie Chapman Story (2011), 
 Double Cross – The True Story of the D Day Spies (2012)
 Kim Philby – His Most Intimate Betrayal (2014).
SAS: Rogue Warriors (2017).

Adaptations
Rogue Heroes (The History of the SAS, Britain's Secret Special Forces Unit That Sabotaged the Nazis and Changed the Nature of War), was adapted in 2022 under the title SAS: Rogue Heroes and released on 30 October 2022.

A six part series titled: A Spy Among Friends, premiered on the streaming service ITVX on 8 December 2022. Its the adaptation of Macintyre's book: A Spy Among Friends: Kim Philby and the Great Betrayal.

Awards and honours
1998 Edgar Award shortlist for The Napoleon of Crime
1998 Macavity Award shortlist for The Napoleon of Crime
2007 Costa Book Awards, biography, shortlist for Agent Zigzag
2008 Galaxy British Book Awards, biography, shortlist for Agent Zigzag
2010 Galaxy British Book Awards, Popular Non-fiction, shortlist for Operation Mincemeat
2011 Duke of Westminster's Medal for Military Literature, shortlist for Operation Mincemeat
2012 Agatha Award, Non-fiction, shortlist for A Spy Among Friends
2013 Edgar Award shortlist for Double Cross
2014 Spear's Book Award, winner for A Spy Among Friends
2018 Baillie Gifford Prize, shortlist for The Spy and the Traitor

Works

 Forgotten Fatherland: The Search for Elisabeth Nietzsche. New York 1992. 
 The Napoleon of Crime: The Life and Times of Adam Worth, Master Thief. New York: Farrar, Straus and Giroux, 1997. .
 A Foreign Field. HarperCollins, 2001. . (American edition: The Englishman's Daughter: A True Story of Love and Betrayal in World War One. New York: Farrar, Straus and Giroux, 2002. .)
 The Man Who Would Be King: The First American in Afghanistan (Josiah Harlan). New York: Farrar, Straus and Giroux, 2004. .
 Agent Zigzag: The True Wartime Story of Eddie Chapman: Lover, Betrayer, Hero, Spy. London: Bloomsbury Publishing, 2007. .

 For Your Eyes Only: Ian Fleming and James Bond. London: Bloomsbury Publishing, 2008. .
 The Last Word: Tales from the Tip of the Mother Tongue. London: Bloomsbury Publishing, 2009. .
 Operation Mincemeat: The True Spy Story that Changed the Course of World War II. London: Bloomsbury Publishing, 2010. .

 Double Cross: The True Story of the D-Day Spies. London: Bloomsbury Publishing, 2012. .
 A Spy Among Friends: Kim Philby and the Great Betrayal. London: Bloomsbury Publishing, 2014. .
 Includes review of A Spy Among Friends: Kim Philby and the Great Betrayal.
 Review of  A Spy Among Friends.
 Rogue Heroes: The History of the SAS, Britain's Secret Special Forces Unit That Sabotaged the Nazis and Changed the Nature of War; McClelland & Stewart; 2017; 400pp; 
 The Spy and the Traitor: The Greatest Espionage Story of the Cold War (Oleg Gordievsky); Viking, 2018, 352pp; 
 Agent Sonya: Lover, Mother, Soldier, Spy; Viking, 2020, 384pp; 
 Colditz: Prisoners of the Castle; Viking, 2022, 384pp;

See also
 List of Old Abingdonians
 SAS: Rogue Heroes
 A Spy Among Friends

References

External links
 Official website
 List of articles by Macintyre
 "Ben Macintyre, columnist", is Macintyre's op-ed page at The Times.
 

1963 births
Living people
The Times people
British columnists
British historians of espionage
Fellows of the Royal Society of Literature
People educated at Abingdon School
Alumni of St John's College, Cambridge
People from Oxford
Historians of World War II
British military historians